Sea of Love is the third studio album by South Korean R&B duo Fly to the Sky. It was released via SM Entertainment on April 26, 2002.  Commercially, the album peaked at number two on the monthly RIAK album chart and sold almost 250,000 copies by the end of the year.

Overview

The duo started off with the poppy ballad "Sea of Love", which became a strong single for the duo, being played and promoted heavily on the various music and performance charts.  Fany had to perform the song solo while Brian was finishing his studies at Rutgers University, which why the solo version was included as a bonus track on the album.

The second single to come from the album was "Condition of My Heart", a ballad written by Brian McKnight and very unlike their previous singles. It was also a strong success, and would become the song that cemented their signature style, as it (and all the singles following afterwards) were vocally strong ballads.

Music video

Sea of Love
The video begins with the duo playing football on the beach with their American friends in San Francisco, with the scenes alternating between the football game and singing in front of the Golden Gate Bridge wearing casual shirts and dancing around the Colonnades and Dome of the Palace of Fine Arts. Throughout the video the duo struggles to win the game. One of the American girls watching the game seems to be attracted to Fany as she stands up with a concerned look on her face when he falls. When he finally makes a touchdown with help from Brian, the song reaches the climax, and the same girl stands up and cheers. After the game ends, the duo drives down the Golden Gate bridge in a sports car. In August 2022, the video was remastered and uploaded to SM's official YouTube channel.

Accolades

Track listing

Charts and sales

Monthly charts

Yearly charts

Sales

References

2002 albums
Fly to the Sky albums
SM Entertainment albums